Griggs Green is a hamlet in the East Hampshire district of Hampshire, England. It is in the civil parish of Bramshott and Liphook.  It is 1 mile (1.7 km) west of Liphook, just south of the A3 road.

The nearest railway station is 1.3 miles (2.2 km) southeast of the village, at Liphook.

Villages in Hampshire